Kualanamu Airport Railink Services (ARS) is an airport rail link service in Medan in North Sumatra, Indonesia. The rail link is built to cut travel time from Medan railway station to Kualanamu International Airport, as roads connecting the airport and Medan city center are frequently affected by traffic congestion. 

The Kualanamu ARS is the first airport rail link in Indonesia connecting passenger between the city centre and airport.

Background

Train services is provided by PT Railink, a joint venture between PT Angkasa Pura II and PT Kereta Api Indonesia. It is the first integrated airport rail link in Indonesia, city check-in and electronic tickets are also available for convenience. The trains were manufactured by Woojin Industrial Systems in South Korea.

In May 2014, double-tracking was completed, cutting travel by at least 10 minutes. The first stage of double tracking, Kualanamu-Bandar Khalipah is predicted to be finished in end 2015, while the second stage as fly over Bandar Khalipah-Medan city is predicted to be finished in mid-year 2016.

The elevated tracks running from Medan Station up till Araskabu Station started operating on 1 December 2019. Beginning 28 September 2022, train services began making brief stops at Bandar Khalipah Station.

Stations

See also

Soekarno–Hatta Airport Rail Link
Minangkabau Airport Rail Link
Adisumarmo Airport Rail Link

References

Airport rail links in Indonesia
Transport in Medan
Transport in North Sumatra
Kualanamu International Airport
Rapid transit in Indonesia